Link: Eat, Love, Kill is a 2022 South Korean television series starring Yeo Jin-goo and Moon Ga-young. It aired on tvN from June 6 to July 26, 2022, every Monday and Tuesday at 22:30 (KST) for 16 episodes. It is also available for streaming on Disney+ in selected regions.

Synopsis
Eun Gye-hoon (Yeo Jin-goo) and his twin sister can feel each other's feelings even if they are far apart and the siblings called this phenomenon 'link'. Gye-hoon, who has never felt a link since his sister's disappearance 18 years ago,  suddenly starts to share a woman's (Moon Ga-young) feelings and feels all her joys, sorrows, and pains.

Cast

Main
 Yeo Jin-goo as Eun Gye-hoon
 A sous chef at a high-end restaurant. He comes to Jihwa-dong, his childhood neighborhood to open a restaurant.
 Moon Ga-young as Noh Da-hyun
 A job seeker who works as a trainee at Jihwayang restaurant.

Supporting

People around Eun Gye-hoon
 Park Bo-kyung as Jang Mi-sook 
 Eun Gye-hoon's mother.
 Kwon Hyuk as Eun Cheol-ho
 Eun Gye-hoon's father.
 Ahn Se-bin as  Eun Gye-young
 Eun Gye-hoon's fraternal twin sister who went missing at the age of 10.
 Woo Mi-hwa as Jang Mi-seon
 Eun Gye-hoon's aunt.

People around Noh Da-hyun
 Kim Ji-young as Hong Bok-hee
 Noh Da-hyun's mother and owner of Chun-ok Hot Pot Restaurant.
 Ye Soo-jung as Na Chun-ok
 Noh Da-hyun's paternal grandmother.

People at Jihwa Police Substation
 Song Duk-ho as Ji Won-tak/Han Sejin
 A police officer and Hwang Min-jo's ex-boyfriend.
 Lee Bom-so-ri as Hwang Min-jo
 A sergeant rank police officer and Ji Won-tak ex-girlfirend.
 Kim Chan-hyung as Ahn Jung-ho
 An Inspector at Jihwa Police Substation.
 Yoo Sung-joo as Seo Young-hwan
 Chief at Jihwa Police Substation.
 Yoo Dong-hoon as Bong Soon-kyung
 A police officer at Jihwa Police Substation.

People at Jihwayang Restaurant
 Lee Suk-hyeong as Cha Jin-ho
 A junior chef of Eun Gye-hoon.
 Lee Bom as Lee Eun-jeong  
 Lee Da-jung's elder sister who starts working at Jihwayang.

Jihwa-dong residents
 Yoo Jung-ho Kim Min-cheol
 A taxi driver, Park Seon-hwa's husband.
 Park Ji-ah as Park Seon-hwa
 Kim Min-cheol's wife.
 Yoon Sang-hwa as Jo Dong-nam
 A construction worker, Yang Dong-sook's husband.
 Kim Kwak-kyung-hee as Yang Dong-sook
 Jo Dong-nam's wife.
 Jung Yeon-shim as Kang Mi-jin
 She is friends with Hong Bok-hee and owner of Mijin's Estate.
 Kim Hyun as Jo Jae-suk
 An aerobics instructor and Go Chang-soo's wife.
 Choi Jae-seop as Go Chang-soo 
 Jo Jae-suk's husband who runs an adult game room in Jihwa-dong.
 Lee Gyu-hoe as Han Eui-chan 
 A man who wanders around the neighbourhood. 18 years ago, he was Eun Gye-young's piano teacher who became a suspect of her disappearance.

Others
Shin Jae-hwi as Lee Jin-geun
 A person who stalks Noh Da-hyun.

Special appearance
 Kim Won-hae as Antonio (Ep. 1)

Production

Casting
The series reunited Yeo Jin-goo and Moon Ga-young after 2010 KBS historical drama The Reputable Family in which they played the childhood counterparts of the protagonists.

Filming
On March 22, 2022, it was announced that filming has temporarily been suspended after Yeo Jin-goo underwent PCR test for COVID-19. A day later, it was announced that his test result was positive and would be absent from filming. It was also announced that filming will resume for other scenes that doesn't have Yeo's involvement.

Original soundtrack

Part 1

Part 2

Part 3

Part 4

Part 5

Part 6

Part 7

Viewership

Notes

References

External links
   
 
 
 
 

TVN (South Korean TV channel) television dramas
Korean-language television shows
Television series by Studio Dragon
Television series by C-JeS Entertainment
South Korean fantasy television series
South Korean melodrama television series
South Korean romance television series
2022 South Korean television series debuts
2022 South Korean television series endings
Television productions suspended due to the COVID-19 pandemic